This is a list of rulers and officeholders of France.

Heads of state
Presidents of France
French monarchs
Frankish Kings

Heads of government
Prime Ministers of France
List of the mayors of the Palaces

Parliament officeholders
Presidents of the National Assembly
Presidents of the Senate

Heads of subdivisions
Colonial and Departmental Heads of Guadeloupe

Heads of former states
List of rulers of Tahiti
King of Burgundy

State office-holders
Great Officers of the Crown of France
Marshal of France
Constable of France

Nobility
Prince of Condé
Prince of Conti
Dukes of Aiguillon
Counts and dukes of Alençon
Counts and dukes of Angoulême
Counts and Dukes of Anjou
Duke of Aquitaine
Counts and Dukes of Auvergne
Duc de Berry
Duke of Bourbon
Duke of Brittany
Duke of Burgundy
Counts and Dukes of Étampes
Dukes of Gascony
Duc de Guise
Duke of Lorraine
Counts and Dukes of Maine
Counts and Dukes of Montpensier
Duc de Nemours
Duke of Normandy
Duke of Orléans
Counts and dukes of Penthièvre
Counts and dukes of Rethel
Counts and Dukes of Vendôme
Counts of Arles
Count of Armagnac
Count of Artois
Lords, Counts, and Dukes of Aumale
County of Auxerre
Count of Blois
Count of Boulogne
Counts of Brienne
Count of Burgundy
Count of Champagne
Count of Clermont-en-Beauvaisis
Count of Comminges
Count of Dreux
Count of Eu
Count of Flanders
Count of Foix
Count of Ligny
Count of La Marche
Count of Meaux
Count of Meulan
Count of Mortain
Count of Nevers
Count of Paris
Count of Perche
Count of Ponthieu
Count of Poitiers
Counts of Provence
Counts of Rouergue
Count of St. Pol
Counts of Toulouse
Counts of Tours
Count of Valentinois
Count of Verdun
Count of Vermandois
Counts of the Véxin
Viscounts of Béarn
Viscount of Narbonne
Lords of Albret
Lords of Baux
Lords of Coucy
Lords of Le Puiset
Lords of Lusignan
Lords of Montpellier
Lords of Montlhéry
Lords of Montmorency

See also
Lists of office-holders

Rulers
France
Rulers